Denbigh Plantation Site, also known as Mathews Manor, is a historic archaeological site located at Newport News, Virginia.  Mathews Manor was built about 1626 for Captain Samuel Mathews. The post-medieval Mathews Manor included a projecting porch and center chimney, both characteristic of Virginia's earliest substantial dwellings. Mathews's house burned about 1650 and was replaced with a smaller house nearby, probably by his son, Samuel Mathews, Jr. (1630-1660), governor of Colonial Virginia (1656-1660). The property was referred to as Denbigh Plantation since the 18th century.

Denbigh Plantation Site was one of the 17th-century sites excavated by Colonial Williamsburg's renowned archeologist Ivor Noël Hume during the 1960s. His findings revealed much about early domestic life in the Virginia colony.  In addition to the manor house, the site also includes several 17th-century industrial sites and the archeological remains of the 18th-century home of the Digges family. The foundations of both the Digges and Mathews houses have been capped and delineate their outlines. An 18th-century dairy and early 19th-century kitchen associated with the Digges homestead are still standing. The earliest known porcelain in Virginia, as well as other early artifacts, were found here during excavation. Although now surrounded by residential development, these sites are preserved within a neighborhood park.

It was listed on the National Register of Historic Places in 1970.

References

External links
 Denbigh Plantation Site at the National Park Service travevl itinerary of James River Plantations
 Denbigh Plantation, Milk House, Lukas Creek Road, Newport News, Newport News, VA at the Historic American Buildings Survey (HABS)
 Denbigh Plantation, Spring House, Lukas Creek Road, Newport News, Newport News, VA at HABS

Archaeological sites on the National Register of Historic Places in Virginia
National Register of Historic Places in Newport News, Virginia
Historic American Buildings Survey in Virginia